Milada is a 2017 Czech biographical film written, produced and directed by David Mrnka. Produced in the English language, it stars Israeli actress Ayelet Zurer as Milada Horáková. The film was a Czech-American co-production by Loaded Vision Entertainment. The movie follows the life of Milada Horáková (1901–1950), a politician who was hanged by the Czechoslovakian communist party on fabricated charges of conspiracy and treason.

Plot
The story of Milada Horáková, democratic pre-WW2 Czech politician who was arrested and tried by the Nazis during World War II. During the postwar years, she was arrested on fabricated charges and executed by the Communist government for her refusal to cease her opposition activity and leave the country.

Cast
 Ayelet Zurer as Milada Horáková
 Robert Gant as Bohuslav Horák
 Daniel Rchichev (age 6), Karina Rchichev (age 13) and Taťjana Medvecká (age 57) as Jana Horáková
 Vica Kerekes as Milada's sister Vera
 Igor Orozovič as Vera's husband
 Jaromír Dulava as Milada's father
 Marián Mitaš as Karel Šváb
 Vladimír Javorský as Alois Schmidt 
 Dagmar Bláhová as Františka Plamínková

Movie postscript
In 1953, Bohuslav Horák (her husband) immigrated alone to Washington, D. C., after several failed attempts to take Jana (their daughter) with him. In 1968, after being separated for nearly 20 years, Bohuslav and his daughter were finally reunited in the US.
 
In 1989, Communism was overthrown in a bloodless revolution.  Czechoslovakia became freed from the communist regime. The movie was dedicated to the continuing fight for freedom of the more than two billion people who live under dictatorships. - TRUTH SHALL PREVAIL - Milada Horáková (1901–1950)

References

External links
 

2017 films
2017 biographical drama films
Czech biographical drama films
Czech historical drama films
Czech multilingual films
2010s Czech-language films
2010s American films
American historical drama films
American multilingual films 
Films about capital punishment
Czech Lion Awards winners (films)
2017 drama films
2010s English-language films